Akanbe is a Japanese facial gesture indicating sarcasm but also used as a taunt. It consists of someone pulling down one's lower eyelid to expose the red underside towards someone, often accompanied by the person sticking their tongue out.

References

See also
 Eyelid pull

Japanese culture
gestures
humour
human eye